The 2012 Australian Open Men's Singles final was the championship tennis match of the men's singles tournament at the 2012 Australian Open between Novak Djokovic and Rafael Nadal, at the time ranked the number 1 and 2 players in the world, respectively. Djokovic defeated Nadal 5–7, 6–4, 6–2, 6–7(5–7), 7–5 to win the tournament. It was the longest major final match (by duration) in history, lasting 5 hours 53 minutes, overtaking the record previously set by the 1988 US Open final between Mats Wilander and Ivan Lendl. It is considered to be one of the greatest tennis matches of all time. With both players operating at their highest levels, the match was regarded as a war of attrition with impeccable quality and duration of play. Before this match, Djokovic played an epic semifinal against Andy Murray which also went to five sets, lasting 4 hours and 50 minutes. The match remains the only time that Nadal has lost a major final after winning the first set.

Match
Nadal won the first set 7–5, gaining a break of serve after a long attritional battle. The second set was equally close, with Djokovic breaking first, losing the advantage, and breaking back to win the set 6–4 and level the match at one set each. The third set was the shortest of the match, as Djokovic broke Nadal twice to take the set 6–2. Nevertheless it was a grueling set that ran 45 minutes, longer than an average set. In this set, Djokovic dropped only two points on serve and broke again in game eight with a crushing forehand to lead for the first time. 

Nadal won the fourth set tiebreak, 7-5 after trailing within the set and also down during the closely contested tiebreak; Djokovic had led 5–3 before Nadal took the next four points. The final set saw a return of the intense play seen in the opening sets. Nadal broke in the sixth game to take a 4–2 lead; Djokovic then broke back to level at 4–4. Finally, Djokovic made a decisive break of serve to win what is, in terms of duration, both the longest Grand Slam final in the Open Era and also the longest match in the history of the Australian Open. The match finished at 1:37am the following morning. Due to exhaustion, both players were given chairs to sit during the trophy presentation speeches.

Legacy

This match is central to the Djokovic–Nadal rivalry. Nadal called it the toughest loss of his career, but the best match he ever played. Djokovic said it was the finest win in his career and also commented on the high level of tennis played. Not only was this the longest Grand Slam final, but according to Tennis Channel and the Australian Open TV networks, this was one of the most-watched finals, despite ending late into the night locally. It was the first and only Grand Slam final that Nadal has lost after winning the first set. It also remains the longest match of both Nadal and Djokovic's careers.

Statistics

Source

Djokovic and Nadal about the match
After the match, Nadal said that "His [Djokovic's] return probably is one of the best in history" and "[He makes it] almost every time". "This one was very special," Nadal said. "But I really understand that was a really special match, and probably a match that's going to be in my mind not because I lost, no, because the way that we played."

Djokovic said, "It was obvious on the court for everybody who has watched the match that both of us, physically, we took the last drop of energy that we had from our bodies, we made history tonight and unfortunately there couldn't be two winners".

See also
 Djokovic–Nadal rivalry
 2008 Wimbledon Championships – Men's singles final
 2012 French Open – Men's singles final
 Longest tennis match records

References

External links 
 Match details at the official ATP site
 Djokovic–Nadal head-to-head at the official ATP site
 Full match on YouTube
 Extended highlights on YouTUbe

Men's Singles
2012
Novak Djokovic tennis matches
Rafael Nadal tennis matches